Bryan Neathway Brown AM (born 23 June 1947) is an Australian actor. He has performed in over eighty film and television projects since the late 1970s, both in his native Australia and abroad. Notable films include Breaker Morant (1980), Give My Regards to Broad Street (1984), F/X (1986), Tai-Pan (1986), Cocktail (1988), Gorillas in the Mist (1988), F/X2 (1991), Along Came Polly (2004), Australia (2008), Kill Me Three Times (2014) and Gods of Egypt (2016). He was nominated for a Golden Globe Award and an Emmy Award for his performance in the television miniseries The Thorn Birds (1983).

Early life
Brown was born in Panania, a south-western Sydney suburb, the son of John "Jack" Brown and Molly Brown, a pianist in the early days of the Langshaw School of Ballet, who also worked as a house cleaner. He grew up with his younger sister, Kristine, in Panania, and began working at AMP as an actuarial student. He started to act in amateur theatre performances, where he discovered a passion for acting.

Career

Theatre
Brown went to Britain in 1972 and eventually won minor roles at the Old Vic. He returned to Australia and became a member of the Genesian Theatre, Sydney. He appeared in Colleen Clifford's production of A Man for All Seasons, before joining the Queensland Theatre Company in 1975 for a tour of The Rainmaker.

Early films
He made his cinema debut in Scobie Malone (1975) as a policeman. He delivered two lines and was listed last in the credits as "Brian Bronn".

In 1977, he had the lead in a short feature, The Love Letters from Teralba Road (1977), which was written and directed by Stephen Wallace.

Brown had small roles in The Irishman (1978), which was directed by Donald Crombie, Weekend of Shadows (1978) from Tom Jeffrey, and The Chant of Jimmie Blacksmith (1978), which was directed by Fred Schepisi.

He had a bigger part in Newsfront (1978), which was directed by Phil Noyce, the miniseries Against the Wind (1978), which was directed by Simon Wincer, and Money Movers (1978), which was directed by Bruce Beresford.

Brown had the lead in the low budget film Third Person Plural (1979) from James Ricketson and a key role in Jeffrey's The Odd Angry Shot (1979) and Crombie's Cathy's Child (1979). He played the lead in a short for Wallace, Conman Harry and the Others (1979), and had a leading role in Albie Thoms' Palm Beach (1980).

In 1980, Brown became known to international audiences for his performance in Breaker Morant, directed by Beresford.

Stardom
Brown played the leading role in Wallace's Stir (1980). He had starring roles in Blood Money (1980), a thriller, and Winter of Our Dreams (1981), a relationship drama with Judy Davis written and directed by John Duigan.

Brown had a huge international success playing the lead role in the TV miniseries, "A Town Like Alice" (1981), which won popularity in the United States. This co-starred Helen Morse and the two of them were reteamed in Far East (1982), written and directed by Duigan.

Brown had another big success internationally with his role as Luke O'Neil in The Thorn Birds (1983), starring Richard Chamberlain and Rachel Ward (whom he later married). Brown was nominated for the Golden Globe Award for Best Supporting Actor – Series, Miniseries or Television Film and the Primetime Emmy Award for Outstanding Supporting Actor – Miniseries or a Movie for his work.

This led to a number of international offers for Brown. He had the lead in a British TV film, Kim (1984) (playing a British agent in Imperial India) and supported Paul McCartney in Give My Regards to Broad Street (1984).

Brown returned to Australia for another miniseries from the makers of Alice, Eureka Stockade (1984), but it was not as popular.

In the UK, Brown played an Australian hitman in Parker (1985) and he returned home to play Cliff Hardy in The Empty Beach (1985). He supported Matt Dillon and Debra Byrne in Rebel (1985).

US career
Brown was given the lead role in the US action film F/X (1986), which was a hit. However Tai-Pan (1986), directed by Daryl Duke from The Thorn Birds, was a huge flop, despite being based on a best seller by James Clavell.

Brown returned to Australia to make The Umbrella Woman (1987) with Ward and then a new version of The Shiralee (1987). He supported Tom Cruise in Cocktail (1988) and Sigourney Weaver in Gorillas in the Mist (1989).

In Australia he played the lead in a World War Two drama, Blood Oath (1990), directed by Wallace and did a romantic comedy based on a story by him and Tony Morphett, Sweet Talker (1991), directed by Mike Jenkins.

In the US he did F/X2 (1991), a sequel to F/X, where he was also executive producer, and the TV film Dead in the Water (1991).

He did a comedy with Dudley Moore, Blame It on the Bellboy (1992), followed by some thrillers: Devlin (1992), The Last Hit (1993), and Age of Treason (1994); in the latter he was a detective in Ancient Rome.

Brown had the lead in a short lived British TV series The Wanderer (1994) and starred in the popular cable film Full Body Massage (1995).

Return to Australia
Brown returned to Australia to star in Dead Heart (1996), which he also produced. He produced and starred in Twisted Tales (1996) which led to an anthology TV series. He played Ned Land in the 1997 miniseries 20,000 Leagues Under the Sea with Michael Caine, then did a TV film for Ken Russell, Dogboys (1998) and a thriller On the Border (1998). In 1999 Brown starred in the romantic comedy Dear Claudia and had a support role in Two Hands (1999) with Heath Ledger and Rose Byrne.

Brown starred in Grizzly Falls (1999), and Journey to the Center of the Earth (1999). In Australia he had a support role in Risk (2000) and the lead in On the Beach (2000) and Dirty Deeds (2002) which he also produced. He produced a short film by his wife, The Big House (2001). Brown had support roles in Footsteps (2003), Along Came Polly (2004), Revenge of the Middle-Aged Woman (2005), Spring Break Shark Attack (2005), and The Poseidon Adventure (2005). He produced a short feature directed by his wife, Martha's New Coat (2005) and made Two Twisted (2005). Back in Australia Brown was in Joanne Lees: Murder in the Outback (2007), and Cactus (2008), which he also co produced. He was in Dean Spanley (2008), and had a small role in Australia (2008).

Brown produced and had a small role in Beautiful Kate (2009), directed by his wife. He was in Limbo (2010) and Love Birds (2011) and guest starred on The Good Wife. He had the lead in Better Man (2013) and appeared in An Accidental Soldier (2013) also directed by his wife. He and his daughter did a short, Lessons from the Grave (2013). He starred in the ghost film The Darkside (2013) and had the lead in a TV series Old School (2013). In 2014 he appeared on stage for the Sydney Theatre Company at the Wharf Theatre with Alison Whyte in David Williamson's play Travelling North.

He was in Kill Me Three Times (2013), Cocktails & Dreams (2015), Deadline Gallipoli (2015), Gods of Egypt (2015), The Light Between Oceans (2016), and Red Dog: True Blue (2016). He had roles in Australia Day (2017), and Sweet Country (2017) and is in Palm Beach directed by his wife, and the 2019 TV series Bloom.

Brown appeared in the opening ceremony of the 2018 Commonwealth Games on the Gold Coast.

His 2021 crime novel, Sweet Jimmy, was published by Allen & Unwin in print and as audio book, narrated by Brown.

Production work
Brown's production company made the series Twisted Tales and Two Twisted (similar to Alfred Hitchcock Presents). The second series had an additional twist: both stories in each episode were connected in some way, and the audience was invited to try to spot the connection.

Honours and awards
Brown was inducted into the Logie Hall of Fame in 1989. He received the Australian Film Institute Award for Best Actor in a Supporting Role for Breaker Morant (1980) and for Two Hands (1999).

In June 2005, Brown was made a Member of the Order of Australia "for service to the community through a range of charitable organisations committed to providing assistance and support to families and young people and to the Australian film and television industry."

The Bryan Brown Theatre & Function Centre in Bankstown, Sydney, was named after him in 2013. He won Longford Lyell Award at the AACTA Awards in 2018.

Personal life
When Bryan Brown was first introduced to Rachel Ward on the set of the TV miniseries The Thorn Birds in 1983, he read her palm and predicted she would have three children. They married a few months after filming wrapped. They have three children, Rosie, Matilda and Joe.

He is a strong supporter of Australian republicanism.

Filmography

Film

Television

References

External links
 
 Bryan Brown, Australian Film Commission
 Bryan Brown's official website, New Town Films

1947 births
Australian male film actors
Australian male stage actors
Australian republicans
Australian male television actors
Logie Award winners
Members of the Order of Australia
Living people
Male actors from Sydney
20th-century Australian male actors
21st-century Australian male actors
Best Supporting Actor AACTA Award winners